The Department of Correctional Services is a department of the South African government. It is responsible for running South Africa's prison system. The department has about 34,000 staff and is responsible for the administration of 240 prisons, which  accommodates about 189,748 inmates. The prisons include minimum, medium and maximum security facilities. The agency is headquartered in the West Block of the Poyntons Building in Pretoria.

The political head of the department is the Minister of Justice and Correctional Services, who is supported by a Deputy Minister of Correctional Services.  the minister is Ronald Lamola and the deputy minister is Patekile Holomisa. In the 2020 budget, R26,800.0 million was appropriated for the department. In the 2018/19 financial year the department had 38,459 employees.

Correctional centres

The 178 prisons run by the department include:
 9 women-only prisons
 13 prisons for young offenders
 40 prisons for male offenders
 72 prisons for both male and female offenders
 5 prisons that are temporarily closed down or undergoing renovations

Notable prisons

 Pollsmoor Prison in the Western Cape Province is the largest maximum security prison and houses inmates serving life or long term sentences.
 C Max in Pretoria is also a maximum security prison which houses inmates serving long sentences and those that are considered flight risks.
 The former Pretoria Central Prison now known as Kgosi Mampuru II (who was hanged at the prison on 22 November 1883 for public violence and revolt, as well as the murder of rival leader Sekhukhune), was the official site for capital punishment in South Africa before the end of apartheid, frequently meted out against opponents of the apartheid regime. Capital punishment was abolished in 1995 (see Capital punishment in South Africa)
 Drakenstein Correctional Centre, the prison from which Nelson Mandela was released after being imprisoned for opposing apartheid.

Branches

 Finance
 Development and Care
 Corrections
 Central Services
 Corporate Services
 Operations & Management Support
 Departmental Investigation Unit (DIU)
 Community Corrections

References

External links 

Correctional Services
South Africa
Prison and correctional agencies
South Africa, Correctional Services
Penal system in South Africa